The Painkiller is a play by Sean Foley, adapted from Francis Veber's Le Contrat. Best known as the author of Le Dîner de Cons, Veber specialises in creating double acts.
Foley's adaptation received its world premiere at the Lyric Theatre, Belfast, on 29 September 2011. The production starred Kenneth Branagh and Rob Brydon, and was directed by Foley.

References 

2011 plays
West End plays